Gollwitzer is the surname of:

 Friedrich Gollwitzer (1889, Bullenheim - 1977), German General
 Gerhard Gollwitzer (1906, Pappenheim - 1973), German artist, author
 Georg Gollwitzer (1874, Kaiserslautern - 1941), German politician
 Heinz Gollwitzer (1917, Nuremberg - 1999), German historian
 Helmut Gollwitzer (1908, Pappenheim - 1993), German Protestant theologian, author
 Karl Albert Gollwitzer (1839, Meringerau bei Augsburg (now Augsburg-Siebenbrunn) - 1917), architect of Augsburg
 Leonhard Gollwitzer, 18th-century German sculptor of Bamberg
 Michael Gollwitzer, false name of Heinrich "Heinz" (Otto) Seetzen (1906, Rüstringen-Wilhelmshaven - 1945)
 Peter M(ax). Gollwitzer (born 1950, Nabburg), a Professor of Psychology

German-language surnames